Țarigrad is a village in Drochia District, Moldova. At the 2004 census, the commune had 4,655 inhabitants.

Notable natives
Ion Costaș

References

Villages of Drochia District